NADH dehydrogenase [ubiquinone] iron-sulfur protein 7, mitochondrial, also knowns as NADH-ubiquinone oxidoreductase 20 kDa subunit, Complex I-20kD (CI-20kD), or PSST subunit is an enzyme that in humans is encoded by the NDUFS7 gene. The NDUFS7 protein is a subunit of NADH dehydrogenase (ubiquinone) also known as Complex I, which is located in the mitochondrial inner membrane and is the largest of the five complexes of the electron transport chain.

Structure 
The NDUFS7 gene is located on the p arm of chromosome 19 in position 13.3. The NDUFS7 gene produces a 25 kDa protein composed of 238 amino acids. The PSST subunit is highly conserved across evolutionary distances. Crystal structures and mutational studies indicate that it is one of the ubiquinone binding sites of Complex I, together with the TYKY (NDUFS8) subunit. It has been proposed that PSST, along with TYKY, 49 kDa, ND1 and ND5 subunits interact with iron-sulfur clusters as part of the catalytic core of NADH dehydrogenase (ubiquinone).

Function 
The PSST subunit encoded by the NDUSF7 gene is one of over 40 subunits involved in the transfer of electrons from NADH to ubiquinone. Specifically, it is thought that the PSST subunit directly couples electron transfer between the iron-sulfur cluster N2 and ubiquinone, along with ubiquinone-binding ND1. Functional evidence for the importance of PSST has been garnered from mutational studies in the obligate aerobic yeast, Yarrow lipolytic, which elucidated a central role in proton translocation that was reduced in mutant forms of the subunit.

Clinical Significance 
Mitochondrial complex I deficiency (MT-C1D) is caused by mutations affecting the NDUFS7 gene. Complex I deficiency is a disorder of the mitochondrial respiratory chain that causes a wide range of clinical manifestations, from lethal neonatal disease to adult-onset neurodegenerative disorders. Phenotypes include macrocephaly with progressive leukodystrophy, non-specific encephalopathy, cardiomyopathy, myopathy, liver disease, Leigh syndrome, Leber's hereditary optic neuropathy, and some forms of Parkinson's disease. Leigh syndrome is an early-onset progressive neurodegenerative disorder characterized by the presence of focal, bilateral lesions in one or more areas of the central nervous system including the brainstem, thalamus, basal ganglia, cerebellum and spinal cord, and is the most common mitochondrial encephalomyopathy. Clinical features depend on which areas of the central nervous system are involved and include subacute onset of psychomotor retardation, hypotonia, ataxia, weakness, vision loss, eye movement abnormalities, seizures, dysphagia, and lactic acidosis.

Interactions 
In addition to co-subunits for complex I, NDUFS7 has protein-protein interactions with ENO2 and ARRB2.

References

Further reading 

 
 
 
 
 
 
 
 
 

Human proteins